Charles Tyringham Praed (1833 – 19 October 1895) was a British Conservative Party politician.

Davenport was elected MP for St Ives at a by-election in 1874, but was quickly unseated after the election was declared void on petition grounds of "general treating". However, he regained the seat at the subsequent by-election in 1875 and remained MP until 1880 when he stepped down.

References

External links

 

Conservative Party (UK) MPs for English constituencies
UK MPs 1874–1880
1833 births
1895 deaths
Members of the Parliament of the United Kingdom for St Ives